The following is a List of Assyrian-Syriac football teams in Sweden.
The Swedish football league system currently has ten levels, with the first five being governed by the Swedish Football Association. The sixth to tenth levels are controlled by regional associations.

Valsta Syrianska IK from Märsta, Stockholm existed between 1993–2015 and reached as high as the third tier.

References

Assyrian-Syriac

Assyrian/Syriac football clubs in Sweden